Karim Djoudi (13 July 1958 – 13 May 2022) was an Algerian politician. He was born in Montpellier, France. He was the Minister of Finance of Algeria from June 2007 to May 2014, in office since 2007. In 2011 Djoudi froze the assets of Muammar Gaddafi in Algeria.

References

1958 births
2022 deaths
Finance ministers of Algeria
Politicians from Montpellier
Workers' Party (Algeria) politicians